Aryshparovo (Arışpar) is a rural locality (a selo) in Inzersky Selsoviet, Beloretsky District, Bashkortostan, Russia.

Demographics
The population was 59 as of 2010. There is 1 street.

Geography 
Aryshparovo is located 115 km northwest of Beloretsk (the district's administrative centre) by road. Nukatovo is the nearest rural locality.

References 

Rural localities in Beloretsky District